McKenna Brand is an American ice hockey forward, currently playing for the Boston Pride of the Premier Hockey Federation (PHF).

Career 
In four seasons with Northeastern University, Brand put up 111 points in 150 games, being named a First Team All-Star in 2017, and twice being named to the All Academic Team. In 2017, her team won Hockey East.

In 2017, she had been selected 11th overall by the Metropolitan Riveters in the NWHL Draft, but chose to sign with the Boston Pride instead in 2018.

In her first professional season, she put up 17 points in 16 games for the Pride, tied for fifth in the league, That year, she was named a finalist for the NWHL's Newcomer of the Year award. The next year, she put up 36 points in 24 games the next season, finishing as the third highest scorer. In 2020, she was named to Team Dempsey for the NWHL All-Star Game.

International 
In 2013, she played 3 games for the United States national hockey team in the U18 USA-Canada Series.

Personal life   
Outside of hockey, Brand has a degree in health sciences. Her brother currently plays hockey for the St. Cloud Huskies.

Career Statistics

Championships

External links

References 

Boston Pride players
1996 births
Living people
Isobel Cup champions
American women's ice hockey forwards
Northeastern Huskies women's ice hockey players
Ice hockey players from Minnesota
People from Park Rapids, Minnesota